Femme Fatale is the fourth studio album by American R&B/jazz singer Miki Howard. Released in 1992 under Giant Records, the album peaked at No. 110 on the US Billboard 200 and No. 7 on Billboards Top R&B Albums chart. The first single from the album, "Ain't Nobody Like You", reached No. 1 on the R&B Singles chart, her second number one on the chart.

The follow-up single, "Release Me", peaked at No. 43 on the chart. A cover of Billie Holiday's "Good Morning Heartache" (and "Shining Through", released as a single) received modest radio-airplay on US R&B and jazz stations.

Track listing

Credits and personnel
Co-producer – Miki Howard 
Executive producer – Cassandra Mills 
Producer – Kenneth Gamble, Leon Huff 
Producer, arranger, keyboards, drums – Rhett Lawrence  
Producer, drums, percussion – Jon Nettlesbey 
Producer, keyboards – David Foster  
Producer, keyboards, synthesizer – Terry Coffey 
Producer, programmer, keyboards, percussion – LeMel Humes

Charts

SinglesYear-end charts (singles)'

References

External links
mikihowardmedia.com

1992 albums
Miki Howard albums
Giant Records (Warner) albums